A Modern Thelma is a 1916 American silent drama film directed by John G. Adolfi and starring Vivian Martin, Harry Hilliard and William H. Tooker.

Cast
 Vivian Martin as Thelma 
 Harry Hilliard as Sir Philip 
 William H. Tooker as Thelma's Father 
 Albert Roccardi
 Maud Sinclair
 Elizabeth Kennedy 
 Allan Walker 
 Stuart Russell 
 Albert Jovell
 Richard Neill
 Pauline Barry
 Flora Nason 
 Lila Leslie
 Gladys Wynne

References

Bibliography
 Solomon, Aubrey. The Fox Film Corporation, 1915-1935: A History and Filmography. McFarland, 2011.

External links
 

1916 films
1916 drama films
1910s English-language films
American silent feature films
Silent American drama films
Films directed by John G. Adolfi
American black-and-white films
Fox Film films
1910s American films